Aya Liu (born 14 September 1978) is a Taiwanese television host, singer and actress.

Liu has won the Best Host in a Variety Programme Award at the Golden Bell Awards in 2008. In 2012, the Chinese media listed her on the Top 10 sexiest TV hostesses in China.

Early life 
Liu was born in Taipei, Taiwan on September 14, 1978, with her ancestral home in Pizhou, Jiangsu. She enrolled at the Taipei Hwa Kang Arts School, where she studied alongside Barbie Shu, Dee Shu and Pace Wu. In 2006, Liu went to study in America, she returned to Taiwan in September 2007.

Career 
Liu hosted the variety show Guess Guess Guess with Jacky Wu in China Television, which earned her a Best Host in a Variety Programme Award at the Golden Bell Awards.

In 2011, Liu appeared in The Allure of Tears, a romance film starring Gigi Leung, Richie Jen, Joe Chen, Shawn Dou and Zhou Dongyu.

In 2012, Liu starred in the motivational film Happiness Me Too, alongside Joe Chen and Sha Yi. She received positive reviews. That same year, she also starred in the romantic comedy film Pink lady.

Personal life 
Liu dated Tony in 2006, when she studied in America, Tony is a Chinese-American businessman.

Her husband is Dzogchen Ponlop Rinpoche. In 2014, Liu gave birth to her daughter Eva in the United States.

Filmography

Television

Film

References

External links

1978 births
Actresses from Taipei
Tibetan Buddhists from Taiwan
Taiwanese television actresses
Taiwanese film actresses
Living people
Participants in Chinese reality television series
Liu
Musicians from Taipei
21st-century Taiwanese singers
21st-century Taiwanese women singers